Sarah Chronis (born 27 August 1986) is a Dutch actress. She is known for her role as Eva Persijn in the television series Onderweg naar morgen.

Career 

She played roles in the television series Rozengeur & Wodka Lime (2004), Kinderen geen bezwaar (2011), Seinpost Den Haag (2011), Flikken Maastricht (2014), Meiden van de Herengracht (2015), Centraal Medisch Centrum (2017) and Nieuwe buren (2019).

In 2019, she made her debut in the long-running soap opera Goede tijden, slechte tijden in the 6000th episode.

In 2019, she participated in the reality television show Wie is de Mol?. She correctly identified the mole (Merel Westrik) and she won the show.

She appears in the film BOEIEN! directed by Bob Wilbers. She appears in the 2023 film Fijn weekend directed by Jon Karthaus. , she is scheduled to appear in the 2023 Netflix film Oei, ik groei!.

Filmography

Film 
 Reckless (2014)
 BOEIEN! (2022)
 Fijn weekend (2023)
 Oei, ik groei! (upcoming, 2023)

Television 

 Rozengeur & Wodka Lime (2004)
 Kinderen geen bezwaar (2011)
 Seinpost Den Haag (2011)
 Flikken Maastricht (2014)
 Meiden van de Herengracht (2015)
 Centraal Medisch Centrum (2017)
 Nieuwe buren (2019)
 Goede tijden, slechte tijden (2019)

As contestant 

 Wie is de Mol? (2019)

References

External links 
 

1986 births
Living people
20th-century Dutch actresses
21st-century Dutch actresses
Dutch film actresses